Robert George Campbell (23 April 1937 – 6 November 2015) was an English professional football player and later manager.

Playing career

He began his career with Liverpool, where he also won England Youth international caps. He then moved on to Portsmouth and later Aldershot.

Coaching and managerial career 
After injury ended his career in 1966, he turned his hand to coaching, at Portsmouth and then, with greater success, at Queens Park Rangers. He went on to work under Bertie Mee at Arsenal as first-team coach, after Steve Burtenshaw's resignation and subsequent departure to Sheffield Wednesday in 1973.

His first managerial job came at Fulham in 1976, after his former boss Alec Stock was sacked. Campbell made a poor start winning no games in his first 3 months as manager. After four years of underachievement Campbell was sacked when the team made a poor start to the 1980–81 season after a disastrous relegation the previous season. He moved on to Portsmouth, whom he led to the Third Division title in 1982–83. However, he was sacked in May 1984 after Portsmouth only narrowly avoided being immediately relegated back to the Third Division. Campbell then returned to Queens Park Rangers for a stint as reserve team manager, before taking up the same position at Chelsea in the summer of 1987.

Towards the end of the 1987–88 season, Campbell was appointed assistant to manager John Hollins, with the team in the midst of a relegation battle; one month later Hollins was sacked and Campbell appointed caretaker manager until the end of the season. Campbell was unable to turn around the club's fortunes in the eight games which remained that season, and they were relegated via the short-lived play-off system.

He made amends the following season, however, as his side romped to promotion as Second Division champions with a haul of 99 points. A year later, he led to Chelsea to a 5th-place finish in the First Division, their highest league placing since 1970. He was relieved of his managerial duties after an 11th-place finish and appointed personal assistant to Chelsea chairman Ken Bates in 1991.

Campbell went on to coach in Kuwait where he managed the two biggest clubs in the country: Al-Arabi SC and Qadsia SC.

Death
He died on 6 November 2015.

References

External links
Liverpool profile

1937 births
2015 deaths
Aldershot F.C. players
Arsenal F.C. non-playing staff
Chelsea F.C. managers
English football managers
English footballers
English people of Scottish descent
Fulham F.C. managers
Association football wing halves
Liverpool F.C. players
Portsmouth F.C. managers
Portsmouth F.C. players
Footballers from Liverpool
Expatriate football managers in Kuwait
English Football League players
English Football League managers
English expatriate football managers
England youth international footballers
Queens Park Rangers F.C. non-playing staff
Kuwait Premier League managers
Qadsia SC managers
Al-Arabi SC (Kuwait) managers